Kings of Comedy may refer to:
 Kings of Comedy (British TV series)
 Kings of Comedy (Australian TV series)

See also
 The Original Kings of Comedy, a 2000 American stand-up comedy film